Super Pack is a compilation album by hip hop group Fly Union. The album was released on April 20, 2010. The album compiles the first four installments of Fly Union's Value Pack series of EPs (Value Pack 1, Value Pack 2, Value Pack 3 and Value Pack 4) along with seven previously unreleased songs. The album features guest appearances from artists Big Sean, Curren$y, Dom Kennedy, and Willie the Kid.

Track listing

Notes
 "Like That" samples "Shiny & New" by Mayer Hawthorne.

References

External links
Super Pack on iTunes
Super Pack on Amazon

2010 compilation albums
Hip hop albums by American artists